In algebraic geometry, the problem of residual intersection asks the following:
Given a subset Z in the intersection  of varieties, understand the complement of Z in the intersection; i.e., the residual set to Z.
The intersection determines a class , the intersection product, in the Chow group of an ambient space and, in this situation, the problem is to understand the class, the residual class to Z:

where  means the part supported on Z; classically the degree of the part supported on Z is called the equivalence of Z.

The two principal applications are the solutions to problems in enumerative geometry (e.g., Steiner's conic problem) and the derivation of the multiple-point formula, the formula allowing one to count or enumerate the points in a fiber even when they are infinitesimally close.

The problem of residual intersection goes back to the 19th century. The modern formulation of the problems and the solutions is due to Fulton and MacPherson. To be precise, they develop the intersection theory by a way of solving the problems of residual intersections (namely, by the use of the Segre class of a normal cone to an intersection.)

Definition 

Let

be closed embeddings, where A is an algebraic variety and Z, W are closed subschemes. Then, by definition, the residual scheme to Z is
.

,
which is the isomorphism if the inclusion  is a regular embedding.

In fact, in applications, one combines Bézout's theorem.

Let  be regular embeddings of schemes, separated and of finite type over the base field; for example, this is the case if Xi are effective Cartier divisors (e.g., hypersurfaces). The intersection product of 

is an element of the Chow group of Y and it  can be written as

where  are positive integers.

Given a set S, we we let

Formulae

Quillen's excess-intersection formula 

Now, suppose we are given Y{{}} → Y and suppose i: X = X ×Y Y → Y is regular of codimension d so that one can define i! as before. Let F be the excess bundle of i and i'; that is, it is the pullback to X{{}} of the quotient of N by the normal bundle of i. Let e(F) be the Euler class (top Chern class) of F, which we view as a homomorphism from Ak−d (X{{}}) to Ak−d(X{{}}). Then

where i! is determined by the morphism Y{{}} → Y → Y.

Finally, it is possible to generalize the above construction and formula to complete intersection morphisms; this extension is discussed in § 6.6. as well as Ch. 17 of loc. cit.Proof: One can deduce the intersection formula from the rather explicit form of a Gysin homomorphism. Let E be a vector bundle on X of rank r and  the projective bundle (here 1 means the trivial line bundle). As usual, we identity P(E ⊕ 1) as a disjoint union of P(E) and E. Then there is the tautological exact sequence

on P(E ⊕ 1). We claim the Gysin homomorphism is given as

Since the injection  splits, we can write

where z is a class of a cycle supported on P(E).
By the Whitney sum formula, we have: c(q*E) = (1 − c1(O(1)))c(ξ) and so

Then we get:

where sI(E ⊕ 1) is the i-th Segre class. Since the zeroth term of a Segre class is the identity and its negative terms are zero, the above expression equals y. Next, since the restriction of ξ to P(E) has a nowhere-vanishing section and z is a class of a cycle supported on P(E), it follows that . Hence, writing π for the projection map of E and j for the inclusion E to P(E⊕1), we get:

where the second-to-last equality is because of the support reason as before. This completes the proof of the explicit form of the Gysin homomorphism.

The rest is formal and straightforward. We use the exact sequence

Writing P for the closure of the specialization of V, by the Whitney sum formula and the projection formula, we have:

One special case of the formula is the self-intersection formula, which says: given a regular embedding i: X → Y with normal bundle N,

(To get this, take Y = Y{{}} = X.) For example, from this and the projection formula, when X, Y are smooth, one can deduce the formula:

in the Chow ring of Y.

Let  be the blow-up along a closed subscheme X,  the exceptional divisor and  the restriction of f. Assume f can be written as a closed immersion followed by a smooth morphism (for example, Y is quasi-projective).

Examples 
Throughout the example section, the base field is algebraically closed and has characteristic zero.

Example: intersection of two plane curves containing the same component 
Set theoretically, their intersectionis the union of a point and an embedded . By Bézout's theorem, it is expected this intersection should contain  points since it is the intersection of two conics, so interpreting this intersection requires a residual intersection. Similarly, the numerator is also , hence the residual intersection is of degree , as expected since  is the complete intersection given by the vanishing locus .

Example: the degree of a curve in three surfaces 
Let  be three surfaces. Suppose the scheme-theoretic intersection  is the disjoint union of a smooth curve C and a zero-dimensional schem S. One can ask: what is the degree of S? This can be answered by #formula.

Example: conics tangent to given five lines 

Let 

So, the total Chern class of it is

Hence, the equivalence of Z is

Example: conics tangent to given five conics 

Suppose we are given five plane conics  in general positions. One can proceed exactly as in the previous example. The intersection  contains the Veronese surface Z of double lines.

Example: functoriality of construction of a refined Gysin homomorphism 

The fuctoriality is the section title refers to: given two regular embedding ,

where the equality has the following sense:

Notes

References 
  
 
 
 Ziv Ran, "Curvilinear enumerative geometry", Preprint, University of Chicago, 1983.

Further reading 
 Intersection Theory with Applications to Gromov-Witten Invariants
Intersection theory